Tim Siedschlag (born 26 September 1987) is a German professional footballer who plays as a midfielder for Holstein Kiel II.

Career
Siedschlag joined Holstein Kiel in 2005. Having made the first team in 2007, he joined VfB Lübeck for the 2010–11 season.

In May 2018, it was announced that Siedschlag had agreed a contract extension until 2021 with Holstein Kiel.

References

External links
 
 Profile at FuPa.net

1987 births
Living people
People from Neumünster
Association football midfielders
German footballers
Holstein Kiel players
Holstein Kiel II players
VfB Lübeck players
2. Bundesliga players
3. Liga players
Regionalliga players
Footballers from Schleswig-Holstein